Jesuit Joe is a mysterious character who appears in the eponymous story of Italian comics creator Hugo Pratt. This graphic novel was initially serialised in Pilote magazine before it was released as hardcover albums in 1980, in France entitled Jésuite Joe, and in Italy, entitled L'uomo del grande nord, published by Dargaud and CEPIM, respectively.

In 2017 the graphic novel was published in English under the name The Man From the Great North by IDW Publishing, in an edition where storyboards made by Pratt for the movie mentioned below have been added to the story.

Plot

The laconic, anti-heroic and unpredictable main character, a Canadian native dressed in the uniform of a Sergeant in the Canadian Mounties, travels the wilderness during late 19th or early 20th century Canada, occasionally assisting those he finds in need of help. He rescues a kidnapped child and frees an imprisoned couple, but also shoots a bird for being too happy and stabs a priest in the hand.

The concerns of famed Italian cartoonist Hugo Pratt included responsibility, humanity, and social justice.  Skepticism of European ideals in colonial settings is a common theme in his stories and forms the main thrust of Jesuit Joe.

The Jesuit Joe film
Jesuit Joe has been adapted into a film directed by Olivier Austen and starring French actress Laurence Treil.

Sources

 Pratt publications in Pilote  BDoubliées 
 Jesuit Joe albums Archivespratt 
 Jesuit Joe French albums Bedetheque

External links

Italian graphic novels
Italian comics titles
1980 comics debuts
1980 comics endings
Comics characters introduced in 1980
Male characters in comics
Comics set in Canada
Italian comics characters
Fictional Royal Canadian Mounted Police officers
Italian comics adapted into films
Comics by Hugo Pratt